Tricia Woodgett (born March 24, 1975) is an American producer, director, film distributor and screenwriter.  Her first feature film, Circles, was accepted to the Pan African Film Festival in 2013.

Early life
Woodgett was born in Ft. McClellan, Anniston, Alabama, United States, to mother Debra Taylor and father Lee Taylor. She lived in Wichita, Kansas and Oklahoma City, Oklahoma before moving to Texas in 1985. She graduated from L.V. Bernker High School in Richardson, Texas in 1993 and obtained her MBA in Finance from Dallas Baptist University in 2010.

She has one brother and three sisters.

Career 
Woodgett became interested in filmmaking while running a book publishing company where she felt inspired to adapt one of the books into a feature film.

Publisher
Woodgett operated her publishing company, Svelte Books. from 2007 to 2012, ultimately publishing nine titles. One of the books, Circles, would later be adapted into a feature film. Circles is about a group of HIV positive men and women whose lives intersect by their fatal choice to knowingly spread the virus as a means of revenge against those they believed had wronged them in some way.

Filmmaking
Intent on turning Circles into a feature film, Woodgett first produced short films before producing full-length films. Her first short film, Til Death Do Us Part, was completed for the 24 Hour Video Race in Dallas, TX, followed by a second short film, The Other Sister. Her first full-length film was Circles. She worked as executive producer, producer, AD and whatever additional roles needed to be filled on this production. The film went on to be accepted into the Pan African Film Festival in Los Angeles, California.

Woodgett began production on her next feature film, Lady Luck, in 2014. The film stars Irma P. Hall from the hit movie Soul Food and Matrix co-star Don Battee. It tells the story of three strangers who are drawn together under one roof, each running from their own personal trials led by faith, perseverance and the desire to move on with their lives.

After Lady Luck, Woodgett was hired on as associate producer on her biggest film project to date, Carter High, the cautionary tale of one of the most fabled high school football teams in Texas, the Carter Cowboys. The powerhouse team suffered a devastating blow in the 1980s when four of its star players were sent to prison as a result of a string of robberies they committed during the football off season. The film was released nationally in October 2015, streaming on Netflix on November 14, 2016.

In 2014, Woodgett also produced the award-winning short films Things You Shouldn't Know About Me and Nothing at All.

Film distribution
In 2016, Woodgett launched the multi-cultural film distribution platform FilmCloud.  FilmCloud Distribution, LLC is a streaming distribution company solely dedicated to multicultural independent film/television content providers.  Its sole purpose is to provide a global platform to all independent filmmakers and to provide one central location to viewers from around the world to access independent films from anywhere at any time. Woodgett owns her own film production company, TigerEye Films LLC.

Personal life
Woodgett resides in Dallas, Texas. She has one son and one daughter.

Filmography

Awards
In 2014, Woodgett's short film Nothing at All was one of the top 20 selections of the Louisiana Film Prize Film Festival

References

External links

Living people
African-American film directors
1975 births
People from Anniston, Alabama
Film directors from Alabama
21st-century African-American people
20th-century African-American people